Huklyvyi is a village in the Zakarpattia Oblast (province) in western Ukraine.  It was in the Volovets Raion (district) before the restructuring in 2020 and is now in the Mukachevo Raion.  Huklyvyi has a wooden church.

Name
According to the JewishGen locality page, Huklyvyi is alternately known as "Huklyvyy [Ukr], Huklivý [Slov], Okliva [Yid], Hukliva [Hun, until 1899], Zúgó [Hun, since 1899], Guklivyy [Rus], Gukliva, Huklivá, Huklivé, Huklivoje, Huklivij."

History
Jewish families that could not prove their citizenship were deported in 1941.  The remaining Jewish population was deported to Auschwitz in May 1944.

Church

The Church of the Holy Spirit (Ukrainian: Церква Святого Духа, Russian: Церковь Святого Духа ) is a wooden Eastern Orthodox Church in Huklyvyi.

See also

References

External links
 Huklyvyy, Ukraine - KehilaLinks

Villages in Mukachevo Raion